Rareuptychia is a monotypic butterfly genus of the subfamily Satyrinae in the family Nymphalidae. Its one species, Rareuptychia clio, is found in the Neotropical realm.

References

Euptychiina
Monotypic butterfly genera
Taxa named by Walter Forster (entomologist)
Taxa named by Gustav Weymer